Mardom was the official newspaper of the Tudeh Party of Iran.

History and profile
Mardom began circulation on 1 February 1942. It was started to contribute to the Tudeh party's achievement of political power. During World War II the paper was part of the campaign against the Axis powers.

Staff
During its early years, Reza Radmanesh and Khalil Maleki served as its editors. Mostafa Fateh also co-edited the newspaper for some time.

References

Publications of the Tudeh Party of Iran
Persian-language newspapers
Newspapers published in Tehran
1942 establishments in Iran
Newspapers established in 1942
Publications disestablished in 1980
Defunct newspapers published in Iran